JB Floyd ( James Robert Floyd; born June 2, 1929) is an American concert pianist (jazz, classical, experimental, avant-garde, and the like), composer, and music pedagogue at the collegiate level.  Before retiring in 2013, Floyd spent 64 years as a music educator in higher education, including as chairman of keyboard performance at Northern Illinois University from 1962 to 1981 and chairman of keyboard performance at the University of Miami's Frost School of Music from 1982 to 2013. Floyd is a Yamaha Artist.

Education
Floyd earned a Bachelor of Music in 1948 and a Master of Music in 1950 from the University of North Texas (College of Music).  While at North Texas, he studied piano with Isabel and Silvio Scionti. In the 1950s, at the University of Corpus Christi, Floyd became head of the Department of Music, then Chairman of the Fine Arts Division.  In Fall 1949, Floyd joined the music faculty of the University of Kentucky as piano instructor.  He also served on the music faculty of Sam Houston State University.

Career
Floyd, in 1949, was a grand winner of the National Guild of Piano Teachers Young Artist Competition at Town Hall in New York City. The award led to a sponsored solo recital at Town Hall, Wednesday, 8:30 , April 9, 1952. Harold C. Schonberg (1915–2003), a music critic for The New York Times, reviewed the performance. Floyd went on to earn a DMA in 1961 from Indiana University's Jacobs School of Music.

In 1962, Floyd joined the music faculty at the University of Northern Illinois.  In 1981, Floyd joined the faculty at the University of Miami.  He taught there for 32 years, retiring as Chair Emeritus in 2013 while serving as Chair of the University of Miami's Department of Keyboard Performance.

Selected discography

Selected publications 
 "Beethoven's Piano Sonata, Op. 111 In Its Historical Perspective" (Master of Music thesis), by James Robert Floyd, University of North Texas, College of Music (1950); 
 "The keyboard music of Pergolesi" (Giovanni Battista Pergolesi) (DMA dissertation), by James Robert Floyd, Indiana University Bloomington, Jacobs School of Music (1961);

Bibliography

Notes

References

 
 
  . . .
 

 

 

 . .

 

 

 

  (print).  (web). . .
 Reference ID: 51919; GS film no. 2240970; digital folder no. 4688276; image no. 285 (of 3534); indexing project (batch) no. C06136-3.

External links 
 

1929 births
20th-century American male musicians
20th-century American pianists
20th-century classical pianists
21st-century American male musicians
21st-century American pianists
21st-century classical pianists
American classical pianists
American male classical pianists
Classical musicians from Florida
Classical musicians from Texas
Jacobs School of Music alumni
Living people
Musicians from Miami
Northern Illinois University faculty
People from Tyler, Texas
University of Miami faculty
University of North Texas College of Music alumni